Waiting For You is the third and final Mandarin studio album of Taiwanese Mandopop quartet boy band F4. Two versions of the album were released on 28 December 2007 by Sony Music Taiwan: Waiting For You (Await Your Love Edition) (在這裡等你 等待摯愛版) and Waiting For You (Feel Your Heart Edition) (在這裡等你 體驗真心版). A collectable edition was released on 5 February 2008, Waiting For You (Special Collectable Edition) (在這裡等你 新春慶功版) with a 16-page photo booklet and bonus DVD with footage from F4's New Songs World Premiere Showcase (F4全球新歌發表會) at Tamshui Fisherman's Wharf, Taipei, Taiwan on 19 January 2008.

The album is organized in the style of a split album with two group tracks and two solo tracks by each group member.

Track listing
 "體驗" ti yan (Experience) - F4
 "在這裡等你" zai zhe li deng ni (Waiting For You) - F4
 "你是我唯一的執著" ni shi wo wei yi de zhi zhuo (You Are My Only Persistence) - Jerry
 "Listen To Your Heart" - Vanness
 "殘念" can nian (Nagging) - Vic
 "愛不停止" ai bu ting zhi (Love Nonstop) - Ken
 "七天" qi tian (seven days) - Vanness
 "白" bai (White) - Vic
 "無所謂" wu suo wei (Doesn't Matter) - Ken
 "我沒有辦法離開你" wo mei you ban fa li kai ni (I Have No Way To Leave You) - Jerry

DVD
New Songs World Premiere Showcase
 Venue: Tamshui Fisherman's Wharf
 Date: 19 January 2008
 "在這裡等你" (Waiting For You) - F4
 "殘念" (Nagging) - Vic 
 "愛不停止" (Love Nonstop) - Ken 
 "七天" (seven days) - Vanness
 "你是我唯一的執著" (You Are My Only Persistence) - Jerry
 "體驗" (Experience) - F4

References

2007 albums
F4 (band) albums
Sony Music Taiwan albums